Damon Jones (born 1976) is an American basketball coach and former player.

Damon Jones may also refer to:

Damon Jones (American football) (born 1974), former American football player
Damon Jones (economist), American economist
Damon Jones (boxer) (born 1993), British boxer
Damon Jones (baseball) (born 1994), baseball player

See also
Damian Jones (disambiguation)